The Flanders Recorder Quartet was a professional recorder group based in Belgium.

History
The group initially formed in 1987 and became more well known upon winning the 1990 competition Musica Antiqua Bruges, Belgium.

Active members
Bart Spanhove
Tom Beets
Joris van Goethem
Paul van Loey

Previous Members: Geert Van Gele, Fumiharu Yoshimine, Peter Van Heyghen, Han Tol

Reception
Reviews for the Flanders Recorder Quartet have been positive, with The New York Times praising the band's performance. The Columbia Spectator also positively reviewed the group, citing the flexibility of the recorders as a highlight. The Flanders Recorder Quartet  has also received positive reviews from the Milwaukee Express and CultureMap Houston.

Of a 1998 performance of The Four Seasons, the Pittsburgh Post-Gazette wrote that the band was "brilliant" but that "for maintaining rhythmic vitality" the band "couldn't match good string playing".

References

External links
Flanders Recorder Quartet

Musical groups established in 1987